Matías Tomás Palavecino (born 23 May 1998) is an Argentine professional footballer who plays as an attacking midfielder for Coquimbo Unido.

Club career
Palavecino started his career with Rosario Central, he was moved into their senior squad by manager Paulo Ferrari during the 2018–19 campaign. He made his senior bow on 26 February 2019 as the club were eliminated from the Copa Argentina by Sol de Mayo of Torneo Federal A, with the midfielder playing eighty-four minutes. Just over two weeks later, on 13 March, Palavecino made his Copa Libertadores debut against Universidad Católica; having previously been an unused substitute for the matchday one group stage encounter with Grêmio. In the succeeding July, Palavecino headed to Cyprus to join second tier team ASIL.

After fourteen appearances and two goals, against Karmiotissa and Aris Limassol respectively, Palavecino returned to his homeland with Primera B Nacional's Gimnasia y Esgrima in September 2020. He scored once, versus Santamarina, in five matches for El Lobo Jujeño. On 17 February 2021, Palavecino returned to the Primera División with Patronato on a free transfer; penning terms until the succeeding December. He debuted in a home defeat to Independiente on 21 February.

In December 2022, he signed with Chilean Primera División side Coquimbo Unido.

International career
In March 2017, Palavecino received a call-up to train with the Argentina U20s.

Career statistics
.

Notes

References

External links

1998 births
Living people
Footballers from Rosario, Santa Fe
Argentine footballers
Association football midfielders
Argentine expatriate footballers
Primera Nacional players
Argentine Primera División players
Rosario Central footballers
Gimnasia y Esgrima de Jujuy footballers
Club Atlético Patronato footballers
Cypriot Second Division players
ASIL Lysi players
Chilean Primera División players
Coquimbo Unido footballers
Expatriate footballers in Cyprus
Argentine expatriate sportspeople in Cyprus
Expatriate footballers in Chile
Argentine expatriate sportspeople in Chile